Bloo may refer to:

 Bloo (EP), extended play by Kacy Hill
 Bloo (rapper) (born 1994), South Korean rapper
 Bloo, fictional character, see List of Foster's Home for Imaginary Friends characters#Bloo
 Sali Bloo, song on The Ivey's album Maybe Tomorrow